Henry Beaufort School is a secondary school in Harestock, a suburb of Winchester, in the county of Hampshire in England.

History 
The school was built in 1971 as the first purpose-built, co-educational, comprehensive school in Winchester to serve the new developments created by the new Teg Down, Weeke Manor, and Harestock estates. The school had a full complement of year 7 students and about half a complement of year 8 students in its first year of operation. The school grew each year until 1975, when it had a full five years of intake.

The school is named after Henry Beaufort, who was Bishop of Winchester and three times Lord Chancellor.

On September 10, 2020, three students were severely injured after the Stagecoach bus carrying them to school collided with a bridge it was too high to pass under. Bus driver Martin Walker pleaded guilty to causing injury by dangerous driving.

Refurbishments

2009 refurbishment 
In January 2009, most buildings were refurbished, including exteriors and interiors. This included painting the building the new navy blue and white as opposed to the pale blue and black before. Construction for a new astroturf pitch started in June 2009 and is now complete.

2013-14 refurbishment 

The largest of the school buildings, known as "Tower Block," housing the languages and humanities departments, started a refit in 2012. While work was being done, the two departments were required to relocate to temporary buildings at the top of the site, but they have now returned to the newly refurbished building. Work on the block was completed in March 2014.

References

 NewsWireless.net - "Wireless turns school into UK technology college, but..." by Guy Kewney, posted on 1 September 2002

External links
 A history of the school from a Weeke perspective

Secondary schools in Hampshire
Schools in Winchester
Community schools in Hampshire